Jan Kåre Hanvold (born 29 April 1951) is a Norwegian fundamentalist televangelist pastor. Hanvold is the owner of television station Visjon Norge that is carried throughout Scandinavia and much of Europe. Hanvold announced that he was praying for the failure of the Norwegian coalition government in 2005.

Hanvold has criticized the Norwegian Princess Märtha Louise's plans to open a private school, known as Astarte Education, teaching students how to communicate with angels. Hanvold accused the princess of "blasphemy" and said she was "an emissary from hell."

Hanvold has a dubious reputation as a businessman, and his resume includes a series of bankruptcies and a jail sentence. He has been criticized for raising obscene amounts of money through his religious media projects, in 2016 the Norwegian state broadcaster NRK estimated that his media projects had raised more than one billion Norwegian kroner in 15 years.  Scrutiny of these projects has discovered that the funds he raises for charity are scantily spent on the purposes for which they are raised. In 2010 Hanvold accused Norwegian fundamentalist Christians of embezzlement, claiming that by donating less than one tenth of their income as tithe to Christian organizations this group is stealing 8 billion Norwegian kroner from God annually. Hanvold, in 2010, made more money than anybody else employed by Norwegian Christian organizations, according to official tax figures.

References

1951 births
Living people
Television evangelists
Norwegian evangelists
Place of birth missing (living people)
Norwegian prisoners and detainees
Prisoners and detainees of Norway
Norwegian white-collar criminals
Norwegian male criminals